Hellas or Ellada is the personification of the nation of Greece, dating back to Ancient Greece. There was a desire for unification in Greece, and Hellas is the only national personification known from that period. She is mentioned frequently in literature but only appears once in the arts of late classical Athens.

Description
Hellas is usually depicted as a woman who wears simple clothes similar to ancient Greek clothes. On her head she wears a crown or an olive wreath.

References

National personifications